Under Cöver is a covers compilation album by the band Motörhead, released on 1 September 2017.

Track listing
Source:

NOTES: -

 "Cat Scratch Fever" & "Hellraiser" were performed live on the Japanese Edition
 2007 Version of "Motörhead" was on CD but used for the music rhythm game Guitar Hero III: Legends of Rock which was released in 2007 (Motörhead DLC in 2008)
 ""Heroes"" was recorded during the band's 2015 Bad Magic album sessions and was one of the final songs recorded by the band prior to Lemmy's death in 2015. "Heroes" would later be rereleased as a part of Bad Magic: Seriously Bad Magic, a reissue of Bad Magic scheduled for release on 24 February 2023.

Personnel

Motörhead
 Lemmy – bass, lead vocals
 Phil "Zööm" Campbell – guitars, backing vocals
 Michael "Würzel" Burston – lead guitar, backing vocals on track 5 and 8
 Mikkey Dee – drums

Guest musicians
 Biff Byford – lead vocals on track 4
 Tommy Aldridge – drums on track 5

Production
 Cameron Webb – producer on tracks 1, 3, 4 and 7 and mixing on track 9
 Bob Kulick and Bruce Bouillet – producers on tracks 2, 6, 10 and 11
 Peter Solley – producer on track 5
 Billy Sherwood – producer on track 8

Charts

References

2017 compilation albums
Motörhead compilation albums
Covers albums